Keith Elliot Greenberg (born May 5, 1959) is a New York Times bestselling author and television producer. He went to Bayside High School in Queens, graduating in January 1977. He attended a number of colleges in the New York area.

Career

His many books include Menudo, To Be the Man, Erik is Homeless, and Zack's Story. In November 2010, Backbeat Books released December 8, 1980: The Day John Lennon Died, Greenberg's minute-by-minute account of the last day of John Lennon's life.

He has written articles for WWE magazine, Playboy, Men's Journal, HuffPost, Maxim and The Village Voice. He previously produced Geraldo at Large, a prime-time television program on Fox News, and America's Most Wanted.  He now works as a senior producer at CNN in the "HLN Originals" unit.

In December 2010, St. Martin's Press released Love Hurts, the story of the Caffey family murder in rural Texas and Greenberg's second true-crime book for the publisher. His first was Perfect Beauty, about a murder in Ohio. In 2017, his third St. Martins true-crime book, Killing for You about a crime in Orange County, California, was released.

In 2015, two of his books were scheduled to be published, Too Fast To Live, Too Young To Die, about the death of James Dean, and the cult that surrounds it (Hal Leonard/Applause Books), and an autobiography of former WWE Champion, the Iron Sheik (ECW Press). The Sheik book was cancelled.  Those who read it have called the book the greatest unpublished treasure in wrestling journalism.

In 2016, he co-authored the third edition of the WWE Encyclopedia of Sports Entertainment with Steve Pantaleo and Kevin Sullivan.  In 2020, he co-authored the fourth version as well, leading to his boast, "You are looking at the man who literally wrote the book on professional wrestling."

In January, 2018, the Toronto Star listed "Best Seat in the House: My Life in the Jeff Healey Band," co-authored by Greenberg and former Jeff Healey Band drummer Tom Stephen, as one of its top five music book recommendations. The Toronto Globe and Mail described the book as "240 beer-soaked...and debauched pages."

His 2019 book, "Where You Goin' With That Gun in Your Hand? The True Crime Blotter of Rock 'n' Roll," published by Backbeat, profiles 21 deaths related to the music industry.  Milwaukee's "Shepherd Express" jokingly described it as a "bloody entertaining read."

Greenberg traveled to Stockholm, Sweden to interview Anna Wohlin, the former model and girlfriend of Brian Jones, who was the last survivor who had been present at his estate when he died in 1969.  It was her final interview.  She died shortly before the book's release.

His book, "Too Sweet: Inside the Indie Wrestling Revolution," was released in 2020 release by ECW Press.  Sports Illustrated praised the book's "elegant prose, and Library Journal wrote, "Professional wrestling fans and historians will be gratified."

While writing the "Colour Commentary" column in the British publication, Inside the Ropes Wrestling Magazine in 2021, he began writing his next book for ECW Press, "Follow the Buzzards: Pro Wrestling in the Age of COVID-19," scheduled for a fall 2022 release.  According to a Forbes review, "The wrestling industry has always been a microcosm of society at large, and I challenge anybody to find a book or publication that does a better job telling the story of pro wrestling in the COVID era than Keith Elliot Greenberg."

History

His first book, Menudo, was published in 1983 and was the story of Menudo, a 1980s pop band. In the mid-1980s, he began working for USA Today, and other news publishers as well.

In 1990, he wrote the PBS documentary The Blue Helmets, about United Nations peace-keeping.

After writing about professional wrestling for a number of newspapers and magazines, he became a regular writer, contributor, and reporter for WWE, known formerly as World Wrestling Federation. He also co-authored a number of biographies of professional wrestlers, including Freddie Blassie, Ric Flair, and Superstar Billy Graham. In 2009, he co-wrote an unreleased biography of The Iron Sheik.

Personal life
A father of two children, he currently resides in Brooklyn, New York.. Keith's oldest child is underground, New York filmmaker Dylan Greenberg.

References

External links

Living people
American non-fiction writers
American television producers
Bayside High School (Queens) alumni
1959 births